Peggy Oti-Boateng is a Ghanaian bio-chemist. She is the current executive director of African Academy of Sciences. She is the immediate former head of UNESCO Science Policy and Capacity Building Department. She was also a former head of the Sciences Sector for the Southern African Development Community, director of the Research Centre at the Kwame Nkrumah University of Science and Technology and former chair of the BioInnovate Africa Programme Advisory Committee (PAC).

Education 
Oti-Boateng received her MSc in biochemistry from Kwame Nkrumah University of Science and Technology Kumasi (Ghana) and her PhD  in Food Science and Technology from Adelaide University in Australia.

Career 
Oti-Boateng began her career in as researcher at the Technology Consultancy Centre at the College of Engineering at KNUST in 1985. In 1989, she became a Consultant and Trainer at the South Australian Department for Training and Employment in Adelaide, Australia. Between 2005 and 2010, she was a Director of the Research Centre at the Kwame Nkrumah University of Science and Technology and in 2011, she joined the UNESCO as a Senior Programme Specialist in Kenya. In 2015, she was transferred to regional office in Harare, Zimbabwe where she became the director of the Division of Science Policy and Capacity Building in the Natural Sciences Sector. In 2022, she became the executive director of African Academy of Sciences.

References 

UNESCO
Kwame Nkrumah University of Science and Technology alumni
University of Adelaide alumni
Fellows of the African Academy of Sciences
Year of birth missing (living people)
Living people